Burundi competed at the 2004 Summer Olympics in Athens, Greece, from August 13 - 29, 2004.

Athletics 

Burundian athletes have so far achieved qualifying standards in the following athletics events (up to a maximum of 3 athletes in each event at the 'A' Standard, and 1 at the 'B' Standard).

Men

Women

Key
Note–Ranks given for track events are within the athlete's heat only
Q = Qualified for the next round
q = Qualified for the next round as a fastest loser or, in field events, by position without achieving the qualifying target
NR = National record
N/A = Round not applicable for the event
Bye = Athlete not required to compete in round

Swimming 

Men

Women

References

External links
Official Report of the XXVIII Olympiad

Nations at the 2004 Summer Olympics
2004
Oly